Switched-On may refer to:

Music

Albums 
Switched-On Bach, a 1968 electronic and baroque album by Wendy Carlos
Switched-On Bacharach, a 1969 electronic album by Christopher Scott
Switched-On Rock, a 1969 Electronic rock album by The Moog Machine
Switched On Santa, a 1969 Christmas album by Sy Mann
Switched-On-Country, a 1970 electronic album by Rick Powell
Switched On Nashville (Country Moog), a 1972 electronic by Gil Trythall
Switched-On Bach II, a 1973 electronic and baroque album by Wendy Carlos
Switched-On Brandenburgs, a 1979 electronic and baroque album by Wendy Carlos
Switched On, a 1992 post-rock compilation album by Stereolab
Refried Ectoplasm (subtitled Switched On, Volume 2), a 1995 compilation album Stereolab
Aluminum Tunes (subtitled Switched On, Volume 3), a 1998 compilation album by Stereolab
Switched On, a 2011 electronic album by Mr. Chop
Switched-On Eugene, a 2018 electronic album

EPs 
Switched On (EP), a 2014 EP by Madchild
Switched on Christmas, a 2000 Christmas EP by Venus Hum

Songs 
 "Switched On", a song by the Beastie Boys from Hello Nasty
 "Switched On", a song by Vaux from There Must Be Some Way to Stop Them

Books 
Switched On (book), a 2016 book by John Elder Robison